St. John the Evangelist Roman Catholic Church, now known as Sweet Prospect Baptist Church, is a historic Roman Catholic church located at Baltimore, Maryland, United States.

Description
Designed by Niernsee & Neilson, it is an 1855-1856 Italianate-influenced masonry structure constructed of stuccoed brick walls resting on a rubble stone foundation. The exterior features twin square towers flanking the main façade and a semi-octagonal apse flanked by one-story pavilions on the back. There are three portal arches in the center section of the main façade, several steps above the sidewalk. It is the most intact remaining example of an Italianate public edifice in Baltimore.

Under instructions from the Roman Catholic Archdiocese of Baltimore, the final mass was held at the Church of St. John the Evangelist, on June 26, 1966, and the congregation merged with that of St. James the Less Roman Catholic Church, just two block away. The church then became the New Central Social Hall. Most of the interior decorative artwork and accessories associated with church use were removed.

St. John the Evangelist Roman Catholic Church was listed on the National Register of Historic Places in 1982.

References

External links

, including photo from 1980, at Maryland Historical Trust
Maryland Historical Society website
Sweet Prospect Baptist Church website

East Baltimore
Irish-American culture in Baltimore
Italianate architecture in Maryland
Roman Catholic churches in Baltimore
Properties of religious function on the National Register of Historic Places in Baltimore
Roman Catholic churches completed in 1855
19th-century Roman Catholic church buildings in the United States
Churches on the National Register of Historic Places in Maryland
Italianate church buildings in the United States